This article contains records and statistics for the Japanese professional football club, Kashima Antlers.

J.League

Domestic cup competitions

Major international competitions

Top scorers by season

References

Kashima Antlers
Kashima Antlers